N.O.W Is the Time is a compilation album by Nightmares on Wax. It was released via Warp on 16 June 2014, to celebrate his 25-year career of releasing music. A standard CD edition comprises 2 discs, titled Nightmares by Day and Nightmares by Night, which consists of 28 of his most popular tracks. A special edition vinyl box set includes Deep Down: Remixes & Rarities, which consists of remixes and rare tracks.

Critical reception

At Metacritic, which assigns a weighted average score out of 100 to reviews from mainstream critics, the album received an average score of 76, based on 5 reviews, indicating "generally favorable reviews".

Jim Carroll of The Irish Times gave the album 4 out of 5 stars, describing it as "a classy round-up of the evolution of the Leeds producer's sound over a quarter century, from the bleep adventures of the early days to the hazy, smokey funk and soul of later years."

Track listing

Charts

References

External links
 

2014 compilation albums
Warp (record label) compilation albums
Nightmares on Wax albums